The Chief Justice of the Gambia is the head of the Gambian judiciary and is responsible for the administration and supervision of the courts. The Chief Justice is also the chief judge of the Supreme Court of the Gambia.

Judges from other Commonwealth countries have served as Chief Justices of The Gambia, but the current Chief Justice is a native Gambian citizen.

Role

Appointment and dismissal 

Section 138 of the Constitution of the Gambia states that the Chief Justice is appointed by the President of the Gambia following consultation with the Judicial Service Commission. Under Section 140, if there is a vacancy in the office of Chief Justice, the next most senior judge on the Supreme Court of the Gambia acts in that role until the President makes a substantive appointment to replace the Chief Justice, which they must do within six months of the post becoming vacant.

According to Section 141, the Chief Justice "may only be removed from office for inability to perform the functions of his or her judicial office, whether arising from infirmity of body or mind, or for misconduct." This can only take place after a majority of National Assembly Members present a motion to the Speaker and a vote in the National Assembly on the motion has a majority of at least two-thirds. After this, a tribunal of three members, one of whom must have held high judicial office, investigates the matter. If they determine that whatever accusations are correct, the National Assembly must again vote, and if a two-thirds majority is again reached, the Chief Justice immediately ceases to hold office.

Duties 

Under Section 64, the Speaker of the National Assembly can request that the Chief Justice appoint a medical board to "enquire into the alleged mental or physical incapacity of the president to discharge the functions of his her office". If this does happen, until the medical board has concluded its report, the Vice-President undertakes the duties of the office of the President. Under Section 67, the Speaker can request that the Chief Justice appoints a tribunal to investigate claims of misconduct by the President if he has received a notice in writing signed by not less than half the National Assembly Members.

It is the responsibility of the Chief Justice to preside over the election of a Speaker, according to Section 93. Section 143 provides for the Chief Justice to "issue orders and directions for the proper and efficient operation of the courts", and in order to do this, they are supported by a Judicial Secretary.

The Chief Justice presides over sittings of the Supreme Court of the Gambia. They are also a member of the Cadi Appeals Selection Committee, according to Section 137 A (4), and chair of the Judicial Service Commission according to Section 145. In order to appoint people to the Judicial Service Commission, the President must consult with the Chief Justice.

History 

Richard Graves MacDonnell was named the first Chief Justice of the Gambia in 1843. Initially, in the colonial Gambia, the Chief Justice was, in fact, a Chief Magistrate, who presided over hearings of the Supreme Court of Judicature of the Gambia. The court held three sessions: the spring session during the first week of March, the summer session during the first week of July, and the autumn session during the third week of November. The court, at the time, had the same jurisdiction, authority and powers of the High Court of Justice did in England and Wales. In 1876, F. H. Spilsbury, the Colonial Surgeon, was appointed as acting Chief Magistrate.

List of Chief Justices

References

Gambia-related lists
The Gambia and the Commonwealth of Nations